Gerald Woollaston (born 17 September 1936) is a Jamaican cricketer. He played in two first-class matches for the Jamaican cricket team in 1959/60 and 1967/68.

See also
 List of Jamaican representative cricketers

References

External links
 

1936 births
Living people
Jamaican cricketers
Jamaica cricketers
Sportspeople from Kingston, Jamaica